Antrocentrum is a genus of red algae belonging to the family Acrotylaceae.

The species of this genus are found in Australia.

Species
Species:
 Antrocentrum nigrescens (Harvey) Kraft & Min-Thein, 1983

References

Gigartinales
Red algae genera